Francesco Grillo is an Italian economist and manager.

He is visiting fellow at the European University Institute in Fiesole, affiliate Professor at Scuola Superiore Sant'Anna in Pisa and teaches at the summer school of University of International Business Economics in Beijing.

Francesco is Managing Director of Vision & Value, a strategy consulting boutique and he advises major institutions (including the European Commission and Italian Ministry of Economy) and multinationals. 

He is also director of Vision Think Tank which convenes two yearly major conferences: one on the future of Europe in Siena and the other one on global governance of climate change (in the Dolomite area). His professional and research interests are around how internet is changing industries and political systems.

Francesco is also  columnist for Il Messaggero, Corriere della Sera, Linkiesta and the Guardian. He is often interviewed by international media like the Economist and he is regular guest on La7, SkyTG24 and RaiNews24.

Education and early career
After graduating in economics from LUISS Guido Carli, he obtained an MBA from Boston University as a Fullbirght scholar. In 1995 he became an associate at McKinsey, where he applied tools typically used in multinational companies within other contexts, such as the evaluation of public policies.

Having left McKinsey, Grillo founded consultancy firm Vision & Value and think tank Vision. Both companies focus research efforts on the effects of the Internet industrial revolution on businesses, cities, and governments.

In 2012, Grillo obtained a PhD in "Political Economy" at London School of Economics and Political Science with a thesis on factors that enable growth across different regions in the new millennium. Grillo's thesis contests the conventional hypothesis that greater R&D expenditure necessarily generates a more rapid growth of GDP. While at Oxford Internet Institute and St Antony's College at University of Oxford and at Scuola Superiore Sant’Anna in Pisa, Grillo continued this line of research along with one ranging from pensions to regional development.

Research
Grillo's research focuses on the so-called “innovation paradox", first observed by Robert Solow  in 1987. Observing data available at the time, Solow observed how the rates of growth of GDP had decreased despite the exponential increase of the quantity of information accessible at any given moment. Grillo identifies the cause of the paradox in what he terms the “technological obsolescence” of liberal democracies. To illustrate the reasons of the crisis, the economist traces a historical parallel between Internet and the invention of the press by Johannes Gutenberg: both media disintermediated the monopolistic reproduction of information. Since a redistribution of power tends to follow a reallocation of information, 21st Century liberal democracies are in crisis: they no longer possess the tools to govern Internet-triggered societal changes.

In comparing Western countries to China, Grillo notes that the Communist country has been more able to govern a technological revolution begun in the West. Meanwhile, Western countries have become more risk-averse, thus widening the gap in terms of societal impact of technologies with China. While similar in some regards to Mariana Mazzucato's work on the Entrepreneurial State, Grillo reflects more on the impact of the Internet on the form of the State itself. Through this comparison with China, Grillo proposes ways to give back to Western democracies the chance to use information to increase the efficiency and efficacy of government.

Published works 

Democracy and Growth in the Twenty-first Century, Springer Nature, London, 2019
Lezioni Cinesi, Solferino Libri, Milan, 2019
Innovation, Democracy and Efficiency: Exploring the Innovation Puzzle within the European Union’s Regional Development Policies, Palgrave, London, 2016
Public Investments in R&D as a Tool for Regional Economic Development (PhD thesis)
Merits, Problems and Paradoxes of Regional Innovation Policies, (2011) Local Economy Volume 26, Paragraphs 6–7, pp. 544–561.
Grillo, F., & Nanetti, R. (2020). Innovation and democracy: The twin paradoxes. Area Development and Policy, 5(3), 233-255.
Grillo, F., & Nanetti, R. (2022). Flexible Transnational Electoral Constituencies. European Liberal Forum, Policy Paper 11.

Bibliography 

 Abramovitz, M. (1986), Catching Up, Forging Ahead, and Falling Behind, in The Journal of Economic History, Cambridge University Press, Vol. 46, No. 2, The Tasks of Economic History, pp. 385–406
 Ahmad, N., Ribarsky, J., and Reinsdorf, M. (2017), Can Potential Mismeasurement of the Digital Economy Explain the Post-Crisis Slowdown in GDP and Productivity Growth?, in OECD Statistics Working Papers, No. 09, OECD Publishing, Paris
 Eggertsson, G. B., Mehrotra, N. R., and Summers, L. H. (2016), Secular Stagnation in the Open Economy, in American Economic Review, 106(5), pp. 503–507
 Gordon, R. J. (2016), The Rise and Fall of American Growth: The U.S. Standard of Living since the Civil War, Princeton University Press
 Landes D. S. (1969), The Unbound Prometheus: Technological Change and Industrial Development in Western Europe from 1750 to the Present, Cambridge University Press
 Mazzucato, M. (2013), The Entrepreneurial State: Debunking Public vs. Private Sector Myths, Anthem Press, London
 Solow, R. (2005), Reflections on Growth Theory in Handbook of Economic Growth, in Aghion, P. and Durlauf, S. (Eds.), Elsevier, Amsterdam
 Yong-Hwan N. and Kyeongwon Y. (2008), Internet, Inequality, and Growth, in Journal of Policy Modeling, Vol. 30, Issue 6, 2008, pp. 1005–1016

References 

Living people
Libera Università Internazionale degli Studi Sociali Guido Carli alumni
20th-century  Italian economists
21st-century  Italian economists
McKinsey & Company people
Boston University alumni
Italian expatriates in the United States
Alumni of the London School of Economics
Italian expatriates in the United Kingdom
20th-century Italian male writers
1965 births